Oriental Mindoro, officially the Province of Oriental Mindoro, is a province in the Philippines located on the island of Mindoro under Mimaropa region in Luzon, about  southwest of Manila. The province is bordered by the Verde Island Passage and the rest of Batangas to the north, by Marinduque, Maestre de Campo (or known as Sibale but official name is Concepcion) Island, Tablas Strait and the rest of Romblon to the east, by Semirara and the rest of Caluya Islands, Antique to the south, and by Occidental Mindoro to the west. Calapan, the only city in the island, is the provincial capital and Mimaropa's regional center.

Oriental Mindoro is touted as the country's emerging eco-tourism destination. In 2005, the Philippines was found to be the center of marine fish biodiversity and the home of the most diverse marine ecosystem in the world, by American biologists Kent Carpenter and Victor Springer. Most of the endemic species in the Philippines are found in the Verde Island Passage between Mindoro island and the main island of Luzon. The passage houses 2,983 individual species of algae, corals, crustaceans, mollusks, fishes, marine reptiles, and marine mammals, based on a study conducted by Carpenter and Springer in 2005.

UNESCO declared Puerto Galera a biosphere reserve under its Man and the Biosphere Programme in the 1970s. The Verde Island Passage is at the apex of the so-called Coral Triangle – the Philippines, Indonesia, and Malaysia – which has the distinction of being the "center of the center of the world's marine biodiversity" and the "center of the center of marine shorefish biodiversity".

History

World War II 
A Japanese force landed on northeastern Mindoro in the Philippine Islands on 27 February 1942.

Almost three years later, after the invasion of Mindoro by Allied forces, they proceeded to land to Bongabong and heading to and capturing Calapan, the capital of the united Mindoro Province at the time on 24 January 1945.

Creation
After World War II, reconstruction and rehabilitation of infrastructure and economy took place on the island, which then constituted a single province. This was partitioned on 13 June 1950 into Oriental Mindoro and Occidental Mindoro by virtue of Republic Act No. 505.

In the decades after the War, Mindoro attracted settlers from overpopulated provinces in the Philippines. Apart from the hope to become landowners or to have better tenancy conditions, the Hukbalahap Rebellion in Central Luzon was an important factor for migration. Under the settlement program of the National Resettlement and Rehabilitation Administration (NARRA) founded in 1954, families from Central Luzon were settled in the Bongabong-Pinamalayan area. Since then, new settlers continue to migrate to Mindoro until today.

On November 15, 1994, a magnitude 7.1 earthquake struck the Verde Island Passage located north of Oriental Mindoro, killing 69 people in the province, with most casualties due to the tsunami caused by the earthquake. Within a year after the calamity, however, the provincial government under Governor Rodolfo G. Valencia was able to successfully rehabilitate the province in a brisk manner, and was thus conferred the Disaster Management Award by the National Disaster Coordinating Council in July 1995.

Armed conflict
The island currently sees an ongoing conflict between the Armed Forces of the Philippines and insurgents. On March 6, 2010, eleven soldiers were killed and seven were hurt in a gun battle with the New People's Army in Mansalay, Oriental Mindoro.

Geography

Oriental Mindoro covers a total area of  occupying the eastern section of Mindoro island in Mimaropa region. The province is bordered by the Verde Island Passage to the north, by Marinduque, Maestre de Campo, Tablas Strait and the rest of Romblon to the east, by Semirara and the rest of Caluya Islands, Antique to the south, and by Occidental Mindoro to the west.

The western portion of the province is mountainous or rugged, while the east has hills and flood plains.

Administrative divisions
Oriental Mindoro comprises 14 municipalities, with one city, Calapan serving as the provincial capital.

Climate
Oriental Mindoro has no distinct wet or dry season. The province experiences maximum rainfall during the months of June to September. Relative humidity is registered at 87%.

Demographics

The province is largely rural, with 70% of the population engaged in agriculture and fishing and with only 30% living in urban centers. Tagalog and English are widely spoken in the province. Other languages spoken are Ilocano and Cebuano. Dialects of the Mangyan language are Arayan, Alagnan, Buhid, Hanunoo, and Tadyawan. Because of the RORO trips coming from Caticlan, a few people from the southern part can understand Hiligaynon.

Religion
A very large portion of the population are of Roman Catholic conviction (81%). Other Christian and Islamic beliefs constitute most of the remaining religious affiliation in the province. Other populations practice indigenous Philippine folk religions, animism, or atheism.

Indigenous people

The indigenous people of Oriental Mindoro are the Mangyans (Manguianes in Spanish, Mañguianes in Old Tagalog), consisting of seven distinct tribes. They occupy the interior, specially the highlands. Mangyans have inhabited the island since pre-history. They are believed to have originally traveled from Indonesia and settled down for good in the island.

Economy

Oriental Mindoro's rich and arable land is suitable for agriculture. It produces large quantities of rice, corn, coconut, vegetables and fruits like calamansi, banana, rambutan, marang or uloy, lanzones and durian. For that, Oriental Mindoro is also known as the Rice Granary and Fruit Basket of Southern Tagalog. It still is the Banana King and Calamansi King of the region. Based on agricultural statistics,  are devoted to palay production while s to coconut plantation. For 2019, the province has been one of the top producers of rice becoming a source of rice for the National Food Authority's rice procurement target.

Tourist attractions

Access from Luzon via the Batangas ports mostly goes through the Verde Island Passage to reach Puerto Galera, the key entry point to Oriental Mindoro. In November 2004, Puerto Galera was voted a member of the UNESCO-affiliated ‘The Club of the Most Beautiful Bays in the World. Puerto Galera features a natural harbor which also protects ships, yachts and bancas from strong typhoons sweeping in from the Pacific.

Puerto Galera, known for white sand beaches and the accompanying honky tonk bar scene on some key beaches, is known for its dive sites with a biodiversity of marine life in and around the coral reefs. Underwater rock formations and coral gardens are home to a variety of marine life, which include numerous species of nudibranch, mantis shrimp, sea anemone, moray and sea fan sea horses. The seas off the coast are host to passing dolphin pods and even the rarer whale shark, and are part of the migratory small whale route from the Visayas.

Local and migratory birds allow birdwatching activities. The province is home to endemic wildlife like the tamaraw, a straight-horned water buffalo.

Other tourist destinations include:

Hidden Paradise

The attraction consists of a natural spring with a swimming pool and picnic cottages. It is located in Baco, and can be reached in 45 minutes by taking a jeepney bound for the Calapan market.

Alibatan Island

The island measures 5 ha and is noted for its white sand. The place serves as the breeding place of seagulls and turtles. Corals and oysters can be found all around the area. The island is also called "Target Island" because Americans used the island for bombing practice in 1946. It is located in Baco, and can be reached in an hour through a motorized banca from the market square.

Buyayao Island

It is a rocky island, except for the area facing Buyayao Peninsula. Big snakes called "sobre kama" are found in the mountains. The water around the island is suitable for deep-sea fishing. It is located off the coast of Mansalay, and can be reached in 30 minutes by motorized banca from Mansalay market.

Suqui Beach

This is a public beach with cottages and other facilities. It is a favorite place for the local people, especially during the summer. It is located in Suqui, Calapan, and can be reached in 15 minutes by taking a tricycle from the town proper.

Banilad Beach

The place is a good spot for picnicking and swimming, especially during the summer. It is located in Pili, Pinamalayan, and can be reached by taking a jeepney to the port of Barangay Wawa, then an hour's ride by motorized banca to the beach.

Bongol Beach

It is a secluded beach, with a  white sand beach. It is located in Bongol, Pinamalayan, and can be reached in two hours by boarding a Bongol-bound jeepney from the town proper of Pinamalayan and then a tricycle to the beach area.

Tamaraw Falls

The  waterfalls, situated alongside the road, is actually a series of asymmetrical falls, leading to the grand one, dropping to a frothy waterbed below. The cascading waterfalls are a great attraction to passers-by. Tamaraw Falls is located in Barangay Villaflor, Puerto Galera. It can be reached in two hours by taking a jeepney bound for Barangay Villaflor from Puerto Galera, or Calapan.

La Laguna Beach

An ideal place for swimming, snorkeling, and scuba diving. There are a number of resorts that offer accommodation and other travel and aqua sports facilities to both domestic and international tourists. It is located in La Laguna, Puerto Galera, and can be reached in 30 minutes from the town proper of Puerto Galera by taking a jeepney bound for La Laguna.

Sabang Beach

This area is ideal for swimming, snorkeling, and scuba diving. A cluster of nightspots abound in this area, which makes it popular for evening socials. Cottages with entertainment facilities stand close to each other. Low-budget accommodations are available. It is located east of Puerto Galera, and can be reached in 15 minutes from the Puerto Galera pier by taking a jeepney or an outrigger banca.

Small La Laguna

Contrary to its name, Small La Laguna is bigger than La Laguna, and has more facilities. It has coral reefs, and its water is ideal for snorkeling and scuba diving. There are diving equipment for rent at nearby dive shops. It is located beside Sabang Beach, and can be reached in 20 minutes from the pier by taking a jeepney bound for Sabang.

Talipanan Beach

This area is not as busy as the other beaches in Puerto Galera. Thus, it is an ideal site for private swimming. It is located in Puerto Galera, and can be reached in 40 minutes by taking a jeepney or an outrigger boat from the town pier.

White Sand Beach

The white sandy strips of this beach offer excellent opportunities for swimming. Resorts in this area provide entertainment facilities for tourists' greater amusement and leisure. It is located in Barangay San Isidro, Puerto Galera, and is accessible in 30 minutes from the town proper by a jeepney or a boat.

Punta Guarda Beach

This beach is far from the busy areas of Puerto Galera; thus, it is ideal for those who seek privacy and retreat. It is located in Puerto Galera, Oriental Mindoro, and can be reached by taking a 10-minute jeepney ride from the town proper, to about one kilometer on the beach mark. The remaining distance is covered on foot.

Melco Beach

It is a beige-colored sandy beach with cottages for rent. It is located in Roxas, Oriental Mindoro, and can be reached in 10 minutes by a banca from the pier.

Education

Higher education institutions in the province:

 Abada College
 ACMCL College
 AMA CLC College of Calapan (ACLC College)
 Baco Community College
 Clarendon College
 CLCC Institute of Computer, Arts & Technology
 Dalubhasaan ng Lungsod ng Calapan (City College of Calapan)
 Divine Word College of Calapan
 Eastern Mindoro College
 Eastern Mindoro Institute of Technology and Sciences
  Erhard Science and Technological Institute - Oriental Mindoro Inc.
 Filipino Academy of Scientific Trades
 Grace Mission College
 Innovative College Of Science in Information Technology
 IATEC Computer College
 Institute of Business Science and Medical Arts
 John Paul College
 Luna Goco Colleges
 Mindoro State University
 Mindoro Bible College
 Paradigm College of Science and Technology
 Pinamalayan Maritime Foundation and Technological College, Inc.
 Polytechnic University of the Philippines - Bansud
 Prince of Peace College
 Colegio De Puerto Galera
 Southwestern Institute of Business and Technology
 Southwestern Maritime Institute Foundation
 Saint Augustine Seminary 
 Simeon Suan Vocational and Technical college
 St. Anthony College Calapan

References

External links

 
 
 Local Governance Performance Management System
 Bird Watching Philippines

 
Provinces of the Philippines
Mindoro
Provinces of Mimaropa
States and territories established in 1950
1950 establishments in the Philippines